Coleman is a city in Sumter County, Florida, United States. The population was 703 at the 2010 census. According to the U.S. Census estimates of 2018, the city had a population of 877.

History

Second Seminole War
On June 8, 1840, Colonel W. J. Worth, Colonel Bennet Riley, and the Second and Eighth Infantry divisions transferred to Fort McClure to search the Lake Panasoffkee area for Seminole warriors. Three days later, the troops discovered an empty village.

Modern town
By 1853, Fort McClure was renamed Warm Springs.

In 1882, the town was renamed Coleman after Dr. B. F. Coleman.

The main industries were citrus, cotton, and cattle.   According to Broward Mill, the past president of the Sumter County Historical Society, Coleman became known for its cabbage production in the early part of the 20th century.

In 1926, the West Palm Beach branch of the Seaboard Air Line began operations in Coleman.

SWFWMD officials sought to preserve over 300 species and neighboring Lake Panasoffkee. Although some residents applauded the move, others, such as Sumter County Commissioner Jim Allen, felt that the agency would prevent public use of the land.

Geography

The city is in the South Central Florida Ridge section as defined by the United States Department of Agriculture. Most of Coleman's soils are sandy and moderately well drained or somewhat poorly drained. Topsoils are acidic, but subsoils may be alkaline with frequent presence of limestone boulders. A somewhat poorly drained, mildly alkaline sandy clay loam lies southeast of the built-up area.

Demographics

As of the census of 2000, 647 people, 257 households, and 178 families resided in the city. The population density was 445.0 inhabitants per square mile (172.3/km). The 301 housing units averaged 207.0 per square mile (80.1/km). The racial makeup of the city was 60.74% White, 36.17% African American, 0.15% Asian, 0.15% Pacific Islander, 2.16% from other races, and 0.62% from two or more races. Hispanics or Latinos of any race were 2.78% of the population.

Of the 257 households, 28.4% had children under the age of 18 living with them, 42.4% were married couples living together, 19.8% had a female householder with no husband present, and 30.4% were not families. About 24.9% of all households were made up of individuals, and 13.2% had someone living alone who was 65 years of age or older. The average household size was 2.52 and the average family size was 2.99.

In the city, the population was distributed as 26.4% under the age of 18, 5.6% from 18 to 24, 29.1% from 25 to 44, 20.1% from 45 to 64, and 18.9% who were 65 years of age or older. The median age was 40 years. For every 100 females, there were 91.4 males. For every 100 females age 18 and over, there were 89.6 males.

Males had a median income of $27,109 versus $16,429 for females. The per capita income for the city was $12,186. About 19.9% of families and 22.7% of the population were below the poverty line, including 31.3% of those under age 18 and 16.7% of those age 65 or over.

References

External links
Coleman History (Sumter Today)

Cities in Sumter County, Florida
Cities in Florida